Lend is a municipality in the district of Zell am See (Pinzgau region), in the state of Salzburg in Austria.

Population

References

Cities and towns in Zell am See District
Salzburg Slate Alps
Ankogel Group
Goldberg Group